Børge Kaas Andersen (26 April 1937 – 16 December 2019) was a Danish rower. He competed in the men's coxless four event at the 1960 Summer Olympics.  He served for some time as the chairman of the umpiring commission of the International Rowing Federation (FISA).

References

1937 births
2019 deaths
Danish male rowers
Olympic rowers of Denmark
Rowers at the 1960 Summer Olympics
Rowers from Copenhagen